Farnetta is a small village in the Terre Arnolfe countryside, 16 miles northwest of the Italian city of Terni, Umbria. It is included in the comune of Montecastrilli in the province of Terni (central Italy). It has a population of 283.

Farnetta derives its name from the old Latin name Quercus Frainetto. It is reputed to be one of Umbria's smallest villages. It has several farms and houses, and a church, dedicated to St Nicolaus, which has its origins in the 16th century but underwent heavy restoration in 1860. The church has been designated by Italian Heritage.

On a nearby hill are the remains of a Medieval hill fort known as Palombara, and the 10th- to 11th-century Romanesque Church of San Lorenzo in Nifili. San Lorenzo was built on the remains of a Roman building, and incorporates large stone blocks from that building. The church is located on an important Roman road (Via Amerina) connecting Amelia to Todi and Perugia.

History 
It is likely that the area was also inhabited in the Iron Age and throughout the Roman period. 
Close to the Roman roads Amerina and Flaminia, the area has numerous elements of early Roman infrastructure, indicating that it was extensively settled.

The village's name's is traditionally connected to the toponym Quercus frainetto, a species of oak.

The village was later part of the Terre Arnolfe, and later subjected to Todi and Terni. Farnetta was listed in the Farfa Abbey register in 1112.

Main sights 
Farnetta is 385 meters above sea level. The Farnetta Natural Park is a protected area (Zona di ripopolamento e cattura) that covers a part of the village. Trails cross the park.

Its historical center was once surrounded by medieval walls. Most of them have been dismantled, leaving only short stretches and a few cylindrical towers that served as part of the town's defenses.

The church of San Nicolo (Nicolaus), in the old part of the village, was begun in the 16th century and completed in the 19th century by the Nevi family. It includes 17th- and 18th-century paintings.

Dunarobba Fossil Forest
The Fossil Forest of Dunarobba, 3 km from Farnetta, is one of the world's oldest forests. Two million years ago, the oceans withdrew from the area, leaving an ancient lake, Tiberino. Water runoff from the emerging hills and mountains carried large quantities of sediments which, along with tectonic movements, covered the forest's giant trees and preserved them.

Culture 
Farnetta is known for its Feast of St. Rita, held the last week of May. During the feast, local residents organize a trattoria with traditional food.

Other medieval towns and villages are present near Farnetta: Todi (17 km), Sangemini, (10 km), Spoleto (42 km), Carsulae (12 km) and Orvieto (38 km).

Transport 
Farnetta is served by Bus Italia services to Terni, Todi, Sangemini, Montecastrilli, Avigliano and Amelia.

Economy
Agriculture was important for Farnetta's rural development and poverty reduction. Today the village has made use of its past and created a tourist industry; many people enjoy agriturismi (farm holidays) in the area.

Demography 
The population of the civil parish, recorded in the 2001 census, is 246. In the 13th century the population was about 500 (96 fireplaces).

List of people from Farnetta 

 Angelo Nevi, Prior of the Comune di Montecastrilli in the 19th century

References 

 Alvi, G. B. (1765), Dizionario topografico tudertino, manoscritto, Archivio Storico Comunale, Todi.
 Alvi, G. B., Genealogie di famiglie tuderti, Archivio Storico Comunale, Todi.
 Cerquaglia, Z., (1999), Il comune di Montecastrilli: da Napoleone all'Unità d’Italia, Ediart, Todi.
 Cerquaglia, Z., (2002), Il Comune di Montecastrilli dall'Unità d'Italia alla Prima Guerra Mondiale, Ediart, Todi.
 Covino, R., (1999), Dal decentramento all'autonomia: la provincia di Terni dal 1927 al 1997, Umbriagraf, Terni.
 Contoli, L., Spada, F., (1974), Ricerche sulle Querce caducifiglie italiane: su alcune stazioni a Quercus Frainetto ten. in comune di Montecastrilli (Terni, Umbria), n. 147, Firenze, Istituto Botanico dell'Università, Webbia, 29: 81-86, 1974.

External links 
 www.comune.montecastrilli.tr.it/
 www.farnetta.it/

Cities and towns in Umbria